Edgar William Jones (born 4 December 1970), also known as Edgar Summertyme, is an English singer-songwriter and musician. Jones was originally the bass player and singer-songwriter for the Stairs and has since formed and fronted the Isrites, The Big Kids, Edgar Jones & the Joneses and Free Peace. He has also played as a session musician for several artists including Ian McCulloch, Paul Weller, Saint Etienne and Ocean Colour Scene.

Career

Early career: to 1994

Jones was born in Liverpool. With Ged Lynn and Paul Maguire, he formed The Stairs, a 1960s-orientated band with English beat, garage rock, blues rock and psychedelic influences. The band's manager, Jason Otty, would often play harmonica, and the band would later feature 2nd guitarists Carl Cook and Daniel Kearney before splitting in 1994. The band achieved cult status with the album Mexican R'n'B (1992).

1995–2001: The Isrites and the Big Kids
Jones also formed The Isrites with Sean Payne later of the Zutons, Paul Maguire's younger brother Dave and Luke Goldberg later of Book, and the Big Kids again with Sean Payne and Russell Pritchard later of The Zutons, and Howie Payne of The Stands. Although both bands split before releasing anything, material has since been issued on several compilations released by The Viper Label.

2002–2011: Edgar Jones & the Joneses and Free Peace
Having ditched the Summertyme pseudonym, Edgar released his first solo album as Edgar "Jones" Jones in 2005 entitled Soothing Music for Stray Cats which encompassing elements of jazz, R&B, soul and doo wop and was recorded on a portastudio donated by Johnny Marr. Edgar then followed the album up with Gettin' a Little Help from The Joneses backed by The Joneses in 2007 and The Masked Marauder in 2009.

Jones formed Free Peace in August 2008 with his nephew Nick Miniski and guitarist Stuart Gimblett. An EP was released via gigs, mail order and independent record shops in Liverpool and were in the process of recordings their debut album, which was set to be released on their own label, Loud Soul in October 2009. The band saw Jones return to the 3 piece rock sound of The Stairs and they had reportedly finished about 20 songs for their debut album. Despite regularly gigging, including major support slots with Oasis, the band split up with an album entitled "Stormy Weather" released under the name "The Edgar Jones Free Peace Thing" in September 2011 on the Viper label over s year after the band disbanded.

2012–present: Solo work
Under the name Edgar Summertyme, Jones released his fourth solo album Sense of Harmony in 2012.

In November 2015, Jones reunited with The Stairs. The Stairs later released a collection of rare recordings with The Viper Label.

In April 2016, Jones' Soothing Music For Stray Cats was re-issued on limited edition vinyl via The Viper Label and Mellowtone Records.

In July 2016, Jones put together a backing band for Johnny Echols of Love, for a show at Sefton Park dubbed From Liverpool With Love featuring guest vocalists such as John Power, Dave McCabe and Nick Ellis.

Jones' latest solo record entitled The Song Of Day and Night was released in 2017, on Skeleton Key Records. Jones put together a touring band, dubbed 'The New Joneses' and toured the UK with fellow Skeleton Key acts as well as headlining the Kristian Ealey Stage at Smithdown Road Festival in Sefton Park's Palmhouse.

Collaborations
Since the break-up of the Stairs, Jones has worked with Ian McCulloch on Mysterio (1992), Paul Weller (live and appears on Live at the Royal Albert Hall DVD, 2000), Johnny Marr in an early version of the Healers (where he was replaced by Alonza Bevan previously of Kula Shaker), Saint Etienne, Cherry Ghost on their Thirst For Romance (2007) and Lee Mavers following the departure of John Power from the La's.

Associated acts

Discography

Studio albums

Compilation albums

Singles & EPs
 Weed Bus (1991) (as The Stairs)
 Woman Gone And Say Goodbye (1992) (as The Stairs)
 Mary Joanna (1992) (as The Stairs)
 Last Time Around (1992) (as The Stairs)
 I'm Bored (1999) (as The Big Kids)
 More than You've Ever Had! (2006) (as Edgar Jones & the Joneses)
 The Way It Is (2007) (as Edgar Jones & the Joneses)
 Mellow Down Pussycat! (2007) (as Edgar Jones & the Joneses)
 Free Peace EP (2009)  (as Free Peace)

Compilation appearances
 1965: Through the Looking Glass (1992) – "Moonchild" (as The Stairs)
 Unearthed: Liverpool Cult Classics, Vol. 1 (2001) – "Skin Up for Me Baby" (as The Stairs)
 The Great Liverpool Acoustic Experiment (2002) – "Mister Can You Tell Me? " (as Edgar Summertyme)
 Unearthed: Liverpool Cult Classics, Vol. 3 (2004) – "Keep It On" (as The Isrites)
 21st Century Liverpool Underground (2005) – "I'm Bored", "Too Much Baby", "For a Moment", "Up to No Good Again", "Hot Potatoes", "Hey, Hey, Now, Now" (as The Big Kids)

Session discography
 Ian McCulloch – Mysterio (1992)
 Saint Etienne – Sound of Water (2000)
 Ocean Colour Scene – Mechanical Wonder (2001)
 Cherry Ghost – Thirst for Romance (2007)
 Black – The Given (2009)
 Mike Badger – Rogue State (2011)

References

External links

1970 births
Living people
English rock bass guitarists
Male bass guitarists
English rock singers
English male singer-songwriters
Musicians from Liverpool
21st-century English singers
21st-century English bass guitarists
21st-century British male singers
The Viper Label artists